Estadio Federativo Reina del Cisne is a multi-use stadium in Loja, Ecuador.  It is currently used mostly for football matches and is the home stadium of Libertad of the Ecuadorian Liga Pro Serie A. The stadium holds 14,935 spectators and opened in 1980.

External links
Stadium information

Federativo Reina del Cisne
Buildings and structures in Loja Province
1980s establishments in Ecuador
Sports venues completed in 1980